Julián Alberto Morrinson Gales (born July 27, 1951) is a former discus thrower from Cuba. He competed for his native country at the 1976 Summer Olympics in Montréal, Quebec, Canada, where he did not reach the final in the men's discus throw event. He won the gold medal at the 1974 Central American and Caribbean Games.

References
sports-reference

1951 births
Living people
Cuban male discus throwers
Olympic athletes of Cuba
Athletes (track and field) at the 1975 Pan American Games
Athletes (track and field) at the 1976 Summer Olympics
Pan American Games silver medalists for Cuba
Pan American Games medalists in athletics (track and field)
Central American and Caribbean Games gold medalists for Cuba
Central American and Caribbean Games silver medalists for Cuba
Competitors at the 1974 Central American and Caribbean Games
Competitors at the 1978 Central American and Caribbean Games
Central American and Caribbean Games medalists in athletics
Medalists at the 1975 Pan American Games
21st-century Cuban people
20th-century Cuban people